Love Faces is a Ugandan drama thriller film written and directed by Usama Mukwaya. It is Mukwaya's feature film directorial debut, and stars Laura Kahunde, Moses Kiboneka Jr., Patriq Nkakalukanyi and Salome Elizabeth in leading roles. The film had a special screening on 31 August 2017 at the Uganda Film Festival 2017. It had its official release on 4 January 2018.

Plot 
Sherry decides to break up with her longtime love Joshua after a disagreement. Joshua's best friend Salim, who wants them to make peace, intervenes. Maria, Sherry's workmate shows up to help her move out. When Maria and Salim are away, a burglar breaks into the house with Joshua and Sherry inside. Joshua realizes after the incident that he still loves her and wants to take all that has happened back. However, Sherry has already made up her mind to leave.

Cast  

 Laura Kahunde as Sherry
 Moses Kiboneka Jr. as Joshua
 Patriq Nkakalukanyi as Salim
 Salome Elizabeth as Maria
 John Iwueke as Zed
 Vince Drey as Jalo
 Raymond Rushabiro as Uncle
 Bobby Tamale as Marvin
 Michael Wawuyo Jr. as Burglar

Production
Principal photography began in September 2016. The film was shot entirely in Kampala, Uganda. Usama teamed up again with Laura Kahunde (Hello) and Patriq Nkakalukanyi (Tiktok) alongside debut film actor Moses Kiboneka Jr. who replaced Michael Wawuyo Jr. due to a conflicting schedule. Actors Raymond Rushabiro and Allen Musumba from Usama's previous films too also made special appearances. The film features original songs by Lary Chary, A Pass, Sheebah Karungi and Ykee Benda on the soundtrack.

Release 

Love Faces had its theatrical release on 4 January 2018. The film was also screened at the 11th edition of the Amakula International Film Festival.

Awards

Won
 2017: Best Cinematography, 7th Pearl International Film Festival
 2018: Best Cinematography, Viewer's Choice Movie Awards
 2018: Best Picture, Viewer's Choice Movie Awards

Nominated
 2017: Best Costume Design and Production Design, Uganda Film Festival
 2018: Best Feature Film, Amakula International Film Festival
 2018: Best Screenplay, Viewer's Choice Movie Awards
 2018: Best Film of the Year, Viewer's Choice Movie Awards
 2018: Best Sound, Viewer's Choice Movie Awards
 2018: Best Film Director, Viewer's Choice Movie Awards
 2018: Best Supporting Actor, Viewer's Choice Movie Awards
 2018: Best Lead Actor, Viewer's Choice Movie Awards
 2018: Best Supporting Actor, Viewer's Choice Movie Awards
 2018: Best Supporting Actress, Viewer's Choice Movie Awards

Sequel
On November 24, 2018 it was announced on the film's official facebook page that a sequel was in development with Usama Mukwaya producing, and Patriq Nkakalukanyi, Salome Elizabeth B and Moses Kiboneka Jr. reprising their roles.

References

External links
 Official website on Facebook
 

English-language Ugandan films
2017 directorial debut films
Films shot in Uganda
Films directed by Usama Mukwaya
Films produced by Usama Mukwaya
Films with screenplays by Usama Mukwaya
O Studios Entertainment films
2010s English-language films